The following highways are numbered 453:

Brazil
 BR-453

Canada
Manitoba Provincial Road 453

Japan
 Route 453 (Japan)

United States
  Kentucky Route 453
  Oregon Route 453
  Pennsylvania Route 453
  Puerto Rico Highway 453